Shushicë may refer to the following places in Albania:

 two villages:
 Shushicë, Elbasan, in the Elbasan municipality
 Shushicë, Vlorë, in the Vlorë municipality
 Shushicë (river), in the Vlorë District

See also 
 Sušice